Raymond Thornton Chandler (July 23, 1888 – March 26, 1959) was an American-British novelist and screenwriter. In 1932, at the age of forty-four, Chandler became a detective fiction writer after losing his job as an oil company executive during the Great Depression. His first short story, "Blackmailers Don't Shoot", was published in 1933 in Black Mask, a popular pulp magazine. His first novel, The Big Sleep, was published in 1939. In addition to his short stories, Chandler published seven novels during his lifetime (an eighth, in progress at the time of his death, was completed by Robert B. Parker). All but Playback have been made into motion pictures, some more than once. In the year before his death, he was elected president of the Mystery Writers of America.

Chandler had an immense stylistic influence on American popular literature. He is a founder of the hardboiled school of detective fiction, along with Dashiell Hammett, James M. Cain and other Black Mask writers. The protagonist of his novels, Philip Marlowe, like Hammett's Sam Spade, is considered by some to be synonymous with "private detective". Both were played in films by Humphrey Bogart, whom many consider to be the quintessential Marlowe.

At least three of Chandler's novels have been regarded as masterpieces, including Farewell, My Lovely (1940), The Little Sister (1949), and The Long Goodbye (1953). The Long Goodbye was praised in an anthology of American crime stories as "arguably the first book since Hammett's The Glass Key, published more than twenty years earlier, to qualify as a serious and significant mainstream novel that just happened to possess elements of mystery".  Four of his novels appear on the British-based Crime Writers Association Poll (1990) of the best 100 crime fiction novels ever published.

Biography

Early life
 
Chandler was born in 1888 in Chicago, the son of Florence Dart (Thornton) and Maurice Benjamin Chandler. He spent his early years in Plattsmouth, Nebraska, living with his mother and father near his cousins and his aunt (his mother's sister) and uncle. Chandler's father, an alcoholic civil engineer who worked for the railway, abandoned the family. To obtain the best possible education for Ray, his mother, originally from Ireland, moved them to the area of Upper Norwood in what is now the London Borough of Croydon, England in 1900.  Another uncle, a successful lawyer in Waterford, Ireland, reluctantly supported them 
while they lived with Chandler's maternal grandmother. Raymond was a first cousin to the actor Max Adrian, a founding member of the Royal Shakespeare Company; Max's mother Mabel was a sister of Florence Thornton. Chandler was classically educated at Dulwich College, London (a public school whose alumni include the authors P. G. Wodehouse and C. S. Forester). He spent some of his childhood summers in Waterford with his mother's family. He did not go to university, instead spending time in Paris and Munich improving his foreign language skills. In 1907, he was naturalized as a British subject in order to take the civil service examination, which he passed. He then took an Admiralty job, lasting just over a year. His first poem was published during that time.

Chandler disliked the servility of the civil service and resigned, to the consternation of his family, became a reporter for the Daily Express and also wrote for The Westminster Gazette. He was unsuccessful as a journalist, but he published reviews and continued writing romantic poetry. An encounter with the slightly older Richard Barham Middleton is said to have influenced him into postponing his career as writer. "I met ... also a young, bearded, and sad-eyed man called Richard Middleton. ... Shortly afterwards he committed suicide in Antwerp, a suicide of despair, I should say. The incident made a great impression on me, because Middleton struck me as having far more talent than I was ever likely to possess; and if he couldn't make a go of it, it wasn't very likely that I could."  Accounting for that time he said, "Of course in those days as now there were ... clever young men who made a decent living as freelances for the numerous literary weeklies", but "I was distinctly not a clever young man. Nor was I at all a happy young man."

In 1912, he borrowed money from his Waterford uncle, who expected it to be repaid with interest, and returned to America, visiting his aunt and uncle before settling in San Francisco for a time, where he took a correspondence course in bookkeeping, finishing ahead of schedule. His mother joined him there in late 1912. Encouraged by Chandler's attorney/oilman friend Warren Lloyd, they moved to Los Angeles in 1913, where he strung tennis rackets, picked fruit and endured a time of scrimping and saving. He found steady employment with the Los Angeles Creamery. In 1917, he traveled to Vancouver, where in August he enlisted in the Canadian Expeditionary Force. He saw combat in the trenches in France with the 16th Battalion, C.E.F. Canadian Scottish Regiment, was twice hospitalized with Spanish flu during the pandemic and was undergoing flight training in the fledgling Royal Air Force (RAF) when the war ended.

After the armistice, he returned to Los Angeles by way of Canada, and soon began a love affair with Pearl Eugenie ("Cissy") Pascal, a married woman 18 years his senior and the stepmother of Gordon Pascal, with whom Chandler had enlisted. Cissy amicably divorced her husband, Julian, in 1920, but Chandler's mother disapproved of the relationship and refused to sanction the marriage. For the next four years Chandler supported both his mother and Cissy. After the death of Florence Chandler on September 26, 1923, he was free to marry Cissy. They were married on February 6, 1924. Having begun in 1922 as a bookkeeper and auditor, Chandler was by 1931 a highly paid vice president of the Dabney Oil Syndicate, but his alcoholism, absenteeism, promiscuity with female employees, and threatened suicides contributed to his dismissal a year later.

As a writer

In straitened financial circumstances during the Great Depression, Chandler turned to his latent writing talent to earn a living, teaching himself to write pulp fiction by analyzing and imitating a novelette by Erle Stanley Gardner. Chandler's first professional work, "Blackmailers Don't Shoot", was published in Black Mask magazine in 1933. According to genre historian Herbert Ruhm, "Chandler, who worked slowly and painstakingly, revising again and again, had taken five months to write the story.  Erle Stanley Gardner could turn out a pulp story in three or four days—and turned out an estimated one thousand."

His first novel, The Big Sleep, was published in 1939, featuring the detective Philip Marlowe, speaking in the first person.  In 1950, Chandler described in a letter to his English publisher, Hamish Hamilton, why he began reading pulp magazines and later wrote for them:

Wandering up and down the Pacific Coast in an automobile I began to read pulp magazines, because they were cheap enough to throw away and because I never had at any time any taste for the kind of thing which is known as women's magazines. This was in the great days of the Black Mask (if I may call them great days) and it struck me that some of the writing was pretty forceful and honest, even though it had its crude aspect. I decided that this might be a good way to try to learn to write fiction and get paid a small amount of money at the same time.  I spent five months over an 18,000 word novelette and sold it for $180. After that I never looked back, although I had a good many uneasy periods looking forward.

His second Marlowe novel, Farewell, My Lovely (1940), became the basis for three movie versions adapted by other screenwriters, including the 1944 film Murder My Sweet, which marked the screen debut of the Marlowe character, played by Dick Powell (whose depiction of Marlowe was applauded by Chandler). Literary success and film adaptations led to a demand for Chandler himself as a screenwriter. He and Billy Wilder co-wrote Double Indemnity (1944), based on James M. Cain's novel of the same title. The noir screenplay was nominated for an Academy Award. Said Wilder, "I would just guide the structure and I would also do a lot of the dialogue, and he (Chandler) would then comprehend and start constructing too." Wilder acknowledged that the dialogue which makes the film so memorable was largely Chandler's.

Chandler's only produced original screenplay was The Blue Dahlia (1946). He had not written a denouement for the script and, according to producer John Houseman, Chandler concluded he could finish the script only if drunk, with the assistance of round-the-clock secretaries and drivers, which Houseman agreed to. The script gained Chandler's second Academy Award nomination for screenplay.

Chandler collaborated on the screenplay of Alfred Hitchcock's Strangers on a Train (1951), an ironic murder story based on Patricia Highsmith's novel, which he thought implausible. Chandler clashed with Hitchcock and they stopped talking after Hitchcock heard Chandler had referred to him as "that fat bastard". Hitchcock made a show of throwing Chandler's two draft screenplays into the studio trash can while holding his nose, but Chandler retained the lead screenwriting credit along with Czenzi Ormonde.

In 1946, the Chandlers moved to La Jolla, an affluent coastal neighborhood of San Diego, California, where Chandler wrote two more Philip Marlowe novels, The Long Goodbye and his last completed work, Playback. The latter was derived from an unproduced courtroom drama screenplay he had written for Universal Studios.

Four chapters of a novel, unfinished at his death, were transformed into a final Philip Marlowe novel, Poodle Springs, by the mystery writer and Chandler admirer Robert B. Parker, in 1989. Parker shares the authorship with Chandler. Parker subsequently wrote a sequel to The Big Sleep entitled Perchance to Dream, which was salted with quotes from the original novel. Chandler's final Marlowe short story, circa 1957, was entitled "The Pencil". It later provided the basis of an episode of the HBO miniseries (1983–86), Philip Marlowe, Private Eye, starring Powers Boothe as Marlowe.

In 2014, "The Princess and the Pedlar" (1917), a previously unknown comic operetta, with libretto by Chandler and music by Julian Pascal, was discovered among the uncatalogued holdings of the Library of Congress. The work was never published or produced. It has been dismissed by the Raymond Chandler estate as "no more than… a curiosity." A small team under the direction of the actor and director Paul Sand is seeking permission to produce the operetta in Los Angeles.

Later life and death
Cissy Chandler died in 1954, after a long illness. Heartbroken and drunk, Chandler neglected to inter her cremated remains, and they sat for 57 years in a storage locker in the basement of Cypress View Mausoleum.

After Cissy's death, Chandler's loneliness worsened his propensity for clinical depression; he returned to drinking alcohol, never quitting it for long, and the quality and quantity of his writing suffered. In 1955, he attempted suicide. In The Long Embrace: Raymond Chandler and the Woman He Loved, Judith Freeman says it was "a cry for help," given that he called the police beforehand, saying he planned to kill himself. Chandler's personal and professional life were both helped and complicated by the women to whom he was attracted, notably Helga Greene (his literary agent), Jean Fracasse (his secretary), Sonia Orwell (George Orwell's widow), and Natasha Spender (Stephen Spender's wife). Chandler regained his U.S. citizenship in 1956, while retaining his British rights.

After a respite in England, he returned to La Jolla. He died at Scripps Memorial Hospital of pneumonial peripheral vascular shock and prerenal uremia (according to the death certificate) in 1959. Helga Greene inherited Chandler's $60,000 estate, after prevailing in a 1960 lawsuit filed by Fracasse contesting Chandler's holographic codicil to his will.

Chandler is buried at Mount Hope Cemetery, in San Diego, California. As Frank MacShane noted in his biography, The Life of Raymond Chandler, Chandler wished to be cremated and placed next to Cissy in Cypress View Mausoleum. Instead, he was buried in Mount Hope, because he had left no funeral or burial instructions.

In 2010, Chandler historian Loren Latker, with the assistance of attorney Aissa Wayne (daughter of John Wayne), brought a petition to disinter Cissy's remains and reinter them with Chandler in Mount Hope. After a hearing in September 2010 in San Diego Superior Court, Judge Richard S. Whitney entered an order granting Latker's request.

On February 14, 2011, Cissy's ashes were conveyed from Cypress View to Mount Hope and interred under a new grave marker above Chandler's, as they had wished. About 100 people attended the ceremony, which included readings by the Rev. Randal Gardner, Powers Boothe, Judith Freeman and Aissa Wayne. The shared gravestone reads, "Dead men are heavier than broken hearts", a quotation from The Big Sleep. Chandler's original gravestone, placed by Jean Fracasse and her children, is still at the head of his grave; the new one is at the foot.

Views on pulp fiction
In his introduction to Trouble Is My Business (1950), a collection of many of his short stories, Chandler provided insight on the formula for the detective story and how the pulp magazines differed from previous detective stories:

Chandler also described the struggle that writers of pulp fiction had in following the formula demanded by the editors of the pulp magazines:

Critical reception
Critics and writers, including W. H. Auden, Evelyn Waugh and Ian Fleming, greatly admired Chandler's prose. In a radio discussion with Chandler, Fleming said that Chandler offered "some of the finest dialogue written in any prose today". Contemporary mystery writer Paul Levine has described Chandler's style as the "literary equivalent of a quick punch to the gut". Chandler's swift-moving, hardboiled style was inspired mostly by Dashiell Hammett, but his sharp and lyrical similes are original: "The muzzle of the Luger looked like the mouth of the Second Street tunnel"; "He had a heart as big as one of Mae West's hips"; "Dead men are heavier than broken hearts"; "I went back to the seasteps and moved down them as cautiously as a cat on a wet floor"; "He was crazy as a pair of waltzing mice, but I liked him." Chandler's writing redefined the private eye fiction genre, led to the coining of the adjective "Chandleresque", and inevitably became the subject of parody and pastiche. Yet the detective Philip Marlowe is not a stereotypical tough guy, but a complex, sometimes sentimental man with few friends, who attended university, who speaks some Spanish and sometimes admires Mexicans and Blacks, and who is a student of chess and classical music. He is a man who refuses a prospective client's fee for a job he considers unethical.

The high regard in which Chandler is generally held today is in contrast to the critical sniping that stung the author during his lifetime. In a March 1942 letter to Blanche Knopf, published in Selected Letters of Raymond Chandler, he wrote, "The thing that rather gets me down is that when I write something that is tough and fast and full of mayhem and murder, I get panned for being tough and fast and full of mayhem and murder, and then when I try to tone down a bit and develop the mental and emotional side of a situation, I get panned for leaving out what I was panned for putting in the first time."

Although his work enjoys general acclaim today, Chandler has been criticized for certain aspects of his writing. The Washington Post reviewer Patrick Anderson described his plots as "rambling at best and incoherent at worst" (notoriously, even Chandler did not know who murdered the chauffeur in The Big Sleep) and Anderson criticized Chandler's treatment of black, female, and homosexual characters, calling him a "rather nasty man at times". Anderson nevertheless praised Chandler as "probably the most lyrical of the major crime writers".

Chandler's short stories and novels are evocatively written, conveying the time, place and ambiance of Los Angeles and environs in the 1930s and 1940s. The places are real, if pseudonymous: Bay City is Santa Monica, Gray Lake is Silver Lake, and Idle Valley a synthesis of wealthy San Fernando Valley communities.

Playback is the only one of his novels not to have been cinematically adapted. Arguably the most notable adaptation is The Big Sleep (1946), by Howard Hawks, with Humphrey Bogart as Philip Marlowe. William Faulkner was a co-writer of the screenplay. Chandler's few screenwriting efforts and the cinematic adaptation of his novels proved stylistically and thematically influential on the American film noir genre. Notable for its revised take on the Marlowe character, transplanting the novel to the 1970s, is Robert Altman's 1973 neo-noir adaptation of The Long Goodbye.

Chandler was also a perceptive critic of detective fiction; his essay "The Simple Art of Murder" is the canonical essay in the field.

In popular culture
British songwriter Robyn Hitchcock paid homage to Chandler in the song "Raymond Chandler Evening" on the 1986 album Element of Light.

In the 11th issue of the influential Cyberpunk fanzine Cheap Truth, Vincent Omniaveritas conducted a fictitious interview with Chandler. The interview opines that Chandler's views towards the potential for respectability in pulp and genre fiction could also be applied to Science Fiction, specifically the Cyberpunk movement. It also derides Chandler's now-famous 1953 caricature of pulp Science Fiction.
In the 2012 documentary, The Doors: Mr. Mojo Risin'- The Story of L.A. Woman, keyboardist Ray Manzarek describes Jim Morrison's lyrics to L.A. Woman: “Another lost angel in the city of night.”  “The lyrics were so good. So Raymond Chandler, so Nathanael West, so 1930s, '40s, dark seamy side of Los Angeles.  A place where Jim would easily go”.

In the season 4 (1993) of the TV series Northern Exposure, episode 16 starts with Chris reading to Ed a book with visible cover showing "Midnight - Raymond Chandler" while sitting in the Brick bar in the fictional town of Cicely, Alaska. Chris reads a passage from a book about the hot dry unnerving desert wind which causes people to act unexpectedly aggressively. The episode itself has a similar premise, namely, the "bad wind" blows through Cicely. After hearing the passage, Ed, impressed, utters "Whoa". Chris winks and says:"Raymond Chandler!"

In season 4, episode 18 of the sitcom Friends, during a debate over whether or not to name one of Phoebe's triplets "Chandler" or "Joey," Joey challenges Chandler to "name one famous person named Chandler."  Chandler replies with "Raymond Chandler," to which Joey responds, "Someone you didn't make up!"

The popular Japanese superhero show Kamen Rider referenced Raymond Chandler's The Long Goodbye in the 2009 series Kamen Rider W. Kamen Rider W is a story of two detectives, Shotaro Hidari and Phillip, who become one when they transform into W, and battle criminals who are powered by drug-like USB flash drives called Gaia Memories. Phillip is named after Philip Marlowe; his name was chosen by Narumi Soukichi, Shotaro Hidari's mentor and fan of Chandler's The Long Goodbye. Many episodes of the show reference the hard-boiled style featured in Chandler's works. The Japanese version of the book can be seen prominently in "Kamen Rider X Kamen Rider W & Decade Movie Taisen 2010" as well as throughout the TV series on Shotaro's shelf, next to his desk where he writes his memoirs of cases in a wannabe hard-boiled, half-boiled style.

In the video game Cyberpunk 2077, there is a side quest called Raymond Chandler Evening, in which the protagonist follows the wife of a client who is suspected of cheating, all while the quest is narrated like a private eye from an old noir film.

Works

References

Works cited

General references
 
 , Foreword by Powell, Lawrence Clark

Further reading
 Bruccoli, Matthew J., ed. (1973). Chandler Before Marlowe: Raymond Chandler's Early Prose and Poetry, 1908–1912. Columbia, S.C.: University of South Carolina Press.
 Chandler, Raymond (1976). The Blue Dahlia (screenplay). Carbondale and Edwardsville, Ill.: Southern Illinois University Press.
 Chandler, Raymond (1985). Raymond Chandler's Unknown Thriller (unfilmed screenplay for Playback). New York: The Mysterious Press.
 Freeman, Judith (2007). The Long Embrace: Raymond Chandler and the Woman He Loved. N.Y.: Pantheon. .
 Gross, Miriam (1977). The World of Raymond Chandler. New York: A & W Publishers.
 Hiney, Tom and MacShane, Frank, eds. (2000). The Raymond Chandler Papers: Selected Letters and Nonfiction, 1909–1959. New York: Atlantic Monthly Press.
 Howe, Alexander N. "The Detective and the Analyst: Truth, Knowledge, and Psychoanalysis in the Hard-Boiled Fiction of Raymond Chandler." Clues: A Journal of Detection 24.4 (Summer 2006): 15–29.
 Howe, Alexander N. (2008). "It Didn't Mean Anything: A Psychoanalytic Reading of American Detective Fiction". North Carolina: McFarland. .
 Joshi, S. T. (2019). "Raymond Chandler: Mean Streets" in Varieties of Crime Fiction (Wildside Press) .
 MacShane, Frank (1976). The Notebooks of Raymond Chandler & English Summer: A Gothic Romance.  New York: The Ecco Press.
 MacShane, Frank, ed. (1981). Selected Letters of Raymond Chandler.  New York: Columbia University Press.
 Moss, Robert (2002.) "Raymond Chandler: A Literary Reference" New York: Carrol & Graf.
 Swirski, Peter (2005). "Raymond Chandler's Aesthetics of Irony" in From Lowbrow to Nobrow. Montreal, London: McGill-Queen's University. .
 Ward, Elizabeth and Alain Silver (1987). Raymond Chandler's Los Angeles. Woodstock, N.Y.: Overlook Press. .
 Williams, Tom (2014).   A Mysterious Something in the Light: The Life of Raymond Chandler . New York: Chicago Review Press. .

External links

 
 
 An essay on Chandler and Los Angeles history by William Marling
 Shamus Town The Los Angeles of Philip Marlowe where Raymond Chandler lived, worked and wrote about.
 "Down the Mean Streets with Philip Marlowe" BBC streaming audio programme on Chandler
 Photographs of Raymond Chandler's Los Angeles by Catherine Corman at The New Yorker
 "Chandler's double identity: Adrian Wootton on a writer's secret cameo"; The Guardian, June 5, 2009
 "Cheap Truth 11 - page 2"; Fanac, September 1, 2017

1888 births
1959 deaths
20th-century American male writers
20th-century American novelists
20th-century English novelists
20th-century short story writers
American crime fiction writers
American detective fiction writers
American emigrants to England
American male novelists
American male screenwriters
American male short story writers
American short story writers
American mystery writers
American people of English descent
American people of Irish descent
British Army personnel of World War I
Burials at Mount Hope Cemetery (San Diego)
Canadian Expeditionary Force soldiers
Civil servants in the Admiralty
Deaths from pneumonia in California
Edgar Award winners
English crime fiction writers
English mystery writers
English male screenwriters
Gordon Highlanders soldiers
Naturalised citizens of the United Kingdom
Novelists from Illinois
People educated at Dulwich College
People from Upper Norwood
Pulp fiction writers
Screenwriters from California
Screenwriters from Illinois
Writers from Chicago
Writers from Los Angeles
20th-century American screenwriters
20th-century English screenwriters
20th-century English male writers